The FDA Most Wanted Fugitives is a list of the top fugitives sought by the United States Food and Drug Administration's Office of Criminal Investigations (OCI). The OCI is responsible for the enforcement of laws related to FDA-regulated products. 

 the list includes:

See also 
 FBI Ten Most Wanted Fugitives
 List of scientific misconduct incidents

References 

Most wanted lists
Food and Drug Administration
Anti-counterfeiting
Counterfeit consumer goods
Health fraud